Tropolys is a German telecommunications company operating on the German market. In July 2005 it merged with Versatel Deutschland.

Apax Partners companies